The flag of Calabria is one of the official symbols of the region of Calabria, Italy. The current flag was adopted on 15 June 1992.

Symbolism
The flag is the coat of arms of Calabria superimposed on the a field of blue, with the words "Regione Calabria" above and below the arms. The coat of arms, adopted on 15 June 1992, is a disc, quartered in saltire, with, clockwise from the top, a pine tree, a Teutonic cross, a light blue truncated Doric column and a Byzantine cross.

References

Calabria
Calabria
Flags introduced in 1999